Yoan Severin (born 24 January 1997) is a French professional footballer who plays for Servette FC in the Swiss Super League.

Club career

Zulte Waregem
He made his debut for the Belgian First Division A side on 24 January (his 20th birthday) against Royal Excel Mouscron. He played the whole match in a 1–0 home win.

Servette FC
On 17 July 2018, Severin moved to Servette in the Swiss Challenge League, signing on a three-year contract. He made his competitive debut for the club on 21 July 2018 in a 2-0 away victory over Aarau. He scored his first competitive goal for the club on 20 October 2018 in a 3-1 home victory against Aarau, similarly to his debut. His goal, scored in the 83rd minute, made the score 2-1 to Servette.

International career
Severin was included in the French squad for the 2017 U20 World Cup. He made only one appearance during the tournament, playing ninety minutes in a 2-0 group stage win over New Zealand.

Career statistics

Club 
(Correct as of 4 March 2017)

Honours

Club
Zulte Waregem
Belgian Cup: 2016–17

References

External links

1997 births
Living people
People from Villeurbanne
French footballers
France youth international footballers
FC Bourgoin-Jallieu players
FC Nantes players
S.V. Zulte Waregem players
Servette FC players
Ligue 1 players
Belgian Pro League players
Swiss Challenge League players
Association football forwards
Sportspeople from Lyon Metropolis
Footballers from Auvergne-Rhône-Alpes